Grnčari is a village in the Resen Municipality of North Macedonia. Located just under  from the municipal centre of Resen, the village has 417 residents.

Demographics
The village of Grnčari is inhabited by an Sunni Muslim Albanian speaking majority and Orthodox Macedonian minority. A few Turkish speaking families are also present in Grnčari. Sunni Albanians in Grnčari traditionally highlighted their religious identity over a linguistic one having closer economic and social relations with Turks and Macedonian Muslims in the region and being distant from Orthodox Macedonians. Over time these differences have disappeared through intermarriage, closer communal and cultural relations with Bektashi and other Sunni Prespa Albanian communities in the region. 

In statistics gathered by Vasil Kanchov in 1900, the village of Grnčari was inhabited by 165 Bulgarian Christians and 300 Muslim Albanians. In 1905 in statistics gathered by Dimitar Mishev Brancoff, Grnčari was inhabited by 120 Bulgarian Exarchists and 360 Muslim Albanians. After World War Two, some Albanian settlements in Yugoslavia declared themselves as Turks due to the word being a generic term for Muslims or pressure by Yugoslav authorities to do so. In the 2002 census, Albanians form a large ethnic majority in the village.

Sports
Local football club KF Lirija Gërçar play in the Macedonian Third League (Southwest Division).

Gallery

References

Villages in Resen Municipality
Albanian communities in North Macedonia